Israel José Rubio Rivero (born 11 January 1981) is a Venezuelan weightlifter.

Rubio originally placed 4th in the men's 62kg weightlifting competition at the 2004 Summer Olympics in Athens, Greece, but was moved to third place and received a bronze medal when the previous bronze medalist, Leonidas Sampanis, was stripped of his medal following a doping scandal.

At the 2008 Summer Olympics he ranked 13th in the men's 69kg weightlifting competition, lifting a total of 306 kg.

Rubio was arrested on January 25, 2012, in the city of Pescara, Italy, for alleged possession of narcotics.

References

External links
  Israel Rubio at databaseolympics.com
 Athlete Biography RUBIO Israel Jose at beijing2008
 

Living people
1981 births
Venezuelan male weightlifters
Olympic weightlifters of Venezuela
Olympic bronze medalists for Venezuela
Weightlifters at the 2003 Pan American Games
Weightlifters at the 2007 Pan American Games
Weightlifters at the 2011 Pan American Games
Weightlifters at the 2004 Summer Olympics
Weightlifters at the 2008 Summer Olympics
Olympic medalists in weightlifting
Medalists at the 2004 Summer Olympics
Pan American Games gold medalists for Venezuela
Pan American Games bronze medalists for Venezuela
Pan American Games medalists in weightlifting
Weightlifters at the 2015 Pan American Games
South American Games gold medalists for Venezuela
South American Games medalists in weightlifting
Competitors at the 2010 South American Games
Medalists at the 2003 Pan American Games
Medalists at the 2011 Pan American Games
20th-century Venezuelan people
21st-century Venezuelan people